Obioma Nnaemeka (born 1948) is a Nigerian-American academic. She is the Chancellor’s Professor of French at Indiana University–Purdue University Indianapolis.

Education
Born in Agulu, Nigeria, Nnaemeka earned her BA from the University of Nigeria, Nsukka, where she studied African Studies, French and German. In 1989 she obtained her PhD in French and Francophone studies from the University of Minnesota.

Academic interests
Before arriving at Indiana University, Nnaemeka taught at the University of Nigeria, Nsukka and at The College of Wooster, Wooster, Ohio. She is a board member of the Global Women’s Leadership Center at the Leavey School of Business.

Nnaemeka is interested in black women writers, feminist theory, transitional feminism, Francophone literatures, the oral and written works of Africans and the African diaspora, as well as gender and human rights. Gender-studies scholar Opportune Zongo wrote in 1996 that "[t]he power of Nnaemeka's work lies in her clear vision, superb intellect, excellent command of language, good sense of humor, and profound knowledge of the African landscape." She developed the idea of "nego-feminism (the feminism of negotiation; no ego feminism) as a term that names African feminisms." This bases itself around the family and complementarity, rather than individual interests.

Service
While at the University of Minnesota in pursuit of her PhD, Dr. Nnaemeka was the President of the Nigerian Students Association and was also active in the International Student Council. Additionally, Dr. Nnaemeka is the founder and president of the Association of African Women Scholars, as well as the President and CEO of the Jessie Obidiegwu Education Fund, an NGO dedicated to the education of women and girls in Africa. Combining her interests in research and teaching, Dr. Nnaemeka has consulted with various international agencies and academic institutions, including the United Nations and the World Bank.

Awards and positions

President, Association of African Women Scholars
CEO, Jessie Obidiegwu Education Fund 
Convener of Internal Conference on Women in African and the African Diaspora 
Distinguished Leadership Award for Internationals from University of Minnesota  
Rockefeller Humanist in Residence 
Edith Kreeger Wolf Distinguished Visiting Professor
SIDA (Sweden)
IRDC (Canada)

Selected works
(1996). ed. Sisterhood, Feminisms, and Power: From Africa to the Diaspora. Trenton, NJ: Africa World Press.
(2005). ed. Female Circumcision and the Politics of Knowledge: African Women in Imperialist Discourse. Westport: Praeger Press.

References

Further reading
"Women's Health and Action Network"
"Distinguished Leadership Award for Internationals"
"Association of African Women Scholars, Executive Officers"

1948 births
University of Minnesota College of Liberal Arts alumni
Indiana University faculty
American women chief executives
American chief executives
Living people
American women academics
21st-century American women